The women's 200 metres event at the 2011 Summer Universiade was held on 18–19 August.

Medalists

Results

Heats
Qualification: First 3 in each heat (Q) and the next 8 fastest (q) qualified for the quarterfinals.

Wind:Heat 1: -0.4 m/s, Heat 2: -0.1 m/s, Heat 3: -1.0 m/s, Heat 4: 0.0 m/s, Heat 5: +1.1 m/s, Heat 6: +0.3 m/s, Heat 7: +1.5 m/s, Heat 8: -0.9 m/s

Quarterfinals
Qualification: First 3 in each heat (Q) and the next 4 fastest (q) qualified for the semifinals.

Wind:Heat 1: 0.0 m/s, Heat 2: -0.1 m/s, Heat 3: +0.6 m/s, Heat 4: +0.6 m/s

Semifinals
Qualification: First 4 of each semifinal qualified directly (Q) for the final.

Wind:Heat 1: +0.8 m/s, Heat 2: -0.7 m/s

Final
Wind: +0.7 m/s

References 
Heats results
Quarterfinals results
Semifinals results
Final results

200
2011 in women's athletics
2011